George Daniel Olds (October 14, 1853 – May 10, 1931) was a mathematician who served a term as the President of Amherst College.

Olds was born in Middleport, New York and received his A.B. (1873) and A.M. (1876) from the University of Rochester. He was professor of mathematics at the University of Rochester (1884–1891) and Amherst College (1891–1927). He served as Dean of the College from 1909 to 1922 and President of Amherst College from 1924 to 1927. Among his students was Calvin Coolidge.

Olds is the father of Leland Olds, an American economist and former head of the U.S. Federal Power Commission.

References

External Links 

 George D. Olds Papers at the Amherst College Archives & Special Collections

 

1853 births
1931 deaths
Presidents of Amherst College